Pertev Öngüner (born January 15, 1991) is a Turkish professional basketball player who plays as a shooting guard for Mamak Bld. Ankara DSİ Era of the Turkish Basketball Second League.

External links
Pertev Öngüner FIBA Profile
Pertev Öngüner TBLStat.net Profile
Pertev Öngüner Eurobasket Profile
Pertev Öngüner TBL Profile

1991 births
Living people
Türk Telekom B.K. players
Sportspeople from Ankara
Turkish men's basketball players
Aliağa Petkim basketball players
Bornova Belediye players
Shooting guards